An Xuyên was a province on the Mekong Delta in during the Republic of Vietnam. On October 22, 1956, Cà Mau province was renamed to Minh Hải. Its capital was Quản Long. On May 8, 1957, it had 6 districts and 23 communes. In February 1976 it was merged with part of Bạc Liêu province to establish Minh Hải province.

Districts 
 Quản Long
 Cái Nước
 Đầm Dơi
 Thới Bình
 Năm Căn
 Sông Ông Đốc

References 
 Provinces of Vietnam at statoids.com

Mekong Delta
Provinces of South Vietnam